The WWE Cruiserweight Championship was a professional wrestling championship in World Wrestling Entertainment (WWE) and was originally a World Championship Wrestling (WCW) title. It was challenged by cruiserweights at a maximum weight of 225 lbs. During the WWE brand extension, it was the only title to be exclusive to the SmackDown! brand during its entire tenure. There were a total of 36 recognized champions who had a combined 34 official reigns. This is a chronological list of wrestlers that held the original WWE Cruiserweight Championship, listed by ring name, with the longest reign being 385 days by Gregory Helms (as well as being the only person to hold this championship for 365 days or more), and the most reigns by Rey Mysterio with 8.

After WCW was purchased by WWE, the inaugural champion was retroactively changed from Shinjiro Otani to Brian Pillman, as WWE recognizes the former WCW Light Heavyweight Championship as part of the original lineage of the Cruiserweight Championship.

Reigns

Names

Reigns

Combined reigns

See also

WCW Light Heavyweight Championship—A previous WCW-sanctioned light-heavyweight championship

References

External links 
 Official WWE Cruiserweight Championship Title History
 WCW Light Heavyweight Championship Title History at Wrestling-Titles.com (1991 - 1992)
 WCW/WWE Cruiserweight Championship Title History at Wrestling-Titles.com (1996 - present)

WWE championships lists
World Championship Wrestling champions lists